Robert Boskovic (born July 1, 1998) is a Canadian professional soccer player who plays as a centre-back.

Club career

Ryerson 
Boskovic played collegiately with the Ryerson Rams. In 2016, he won the Lou Bilek Award as U Sports Rookie of the Year becoming the first Ryerson player to do so since its inception in 1999.

Toronto FC II 
Boskovic made his USL debut on August 15, 2015 against the Richmond Kickers. Boskovic made three appearances for Toronto FC II during the 2015 USL season, after being rewarded with a call-up from the TFC Academy. On August 1, 2015, he made his professional debut when coming off the bench in a 2-1 victory over Richmond Kickers. He soon followed up with a second cameo appearance in 3-2 win over FC Montreal. Boskovic made his first start later that season, in a 4-1 defeat to Charlotte Independence on September 9, 2015.

Boskovic remains on loan with affiliate club Toronto FC II ahead of the 2016 USL season. Boskovic becomes the 36th player to sign professionally with Toronto FC II on March 15, 2018. He was released by TFC II on December 23, 2020.

Ottawa Fury (loan) 
On March 6, 2019 it was announced that Boskovic would be loaned to USL Championship club Ottawa Fury FC for the 2019 season. He made nine league appearances that season, and appeared in Ottawa's playoff series against Charleston Battery.

Cavalry FC (loan) 
On March 11, 2020, Boskovic re-signed with Toronto and was subsequently loaned to Canadian Premier League side Cavalry FC for the 2020 season. He made his debut for Cavalry on August 16 against Valour FC.

Pacific FC
On August 10, 2021, he signed with Pacific FC of the Canadian Premier League. After the 2021 season, he left the club.

International career

Youth
Boskovic was named to the Canadian U-23 provisional roster for the 2020 CONCACAF Men's Olympic Qualifying Championship on February 26, 2020.

Honours

Club
Pacific FC
Canadian Premier League: 2021

Ryerson University   

2022 World Champion (Game Winning Goal)

Career statistics

References

External links 

 Robert Boskovic at Toronto FC
 
 

1998 births
Living people
Association football defenders
Canadian soccer players
Soccer players from Mississauga
Toronto FC II players
Toronto Metropolitan University alumni
Ottawa Fury FC players
Cavalry FC players
USL League Two players
League1 Ontario players
USL Championship players
Canadian Premier League players
Pacific FC players
Toronto FC players